Acropora abrolhosensis is a species of acroporid coral that was first described by John Veron in 1985. Found in sheltered lagoons and shallow reefs, it is listed as a vulnerable species on the IUCN Red List. The population of the species is decreasing, and most specimens are found in Western Australia, but occurs in many other areas. It is also listed under CITES Appendix II.

Description
Acropora abrolhosensis specimens are found in tree-shaped colonies and are pink, blue, or brown, and the branch tips are pale in colour. These colonies consist of several straight branches, which have large axial corallites (at the end of each branch) and the radial corallites (up the side of each branch) contain circular openings and have swollen ends. It is similar to Acropora copiosa and Acropora loisetteae.

Distribution
Acropora abrolhosensis can be found in Australian waters, the Sea of Japan, the Great Barrier Reef, the Coral Sea, the East China Sea, the Solomon Islands and the western Pacific. It is abundant at the Houtman Abrolhos Islands. It is also believed to exist at the Marshall Islands and Fiji. It is threatened by reef destruction and bleaching, and the population may be affected by the Acanthaster placini.

It is classed as a vulnerable species on the IUCN Red List as the population is decreasing, and is listed under Appendix II of CITES. Its population is unknown but is likely to be threatened by the global reduction of coral reefs, the increase of temperature causing bleaching, and disease.

Taxonomy
Acropora abrolhosensis was first described by John Veron in 1985 at Australian coral reefs.

References

Acropora
Cnidarians of the Pacific Ocean
Cnidarians of Australia
Marine fauna of Asia
Marine fauna of Oceania
Vulnerable fauna of Asia
Vulnerable fauna of Oceania
Vulnerable fauna of Australia
Animals described in 1985